Project West Ford (also known as Westford Needles and Project Needles) was a test carried out by Massachusetts Institute of Technology's Lincoln Laboratory on behalf of the United States military in 1961 and 1963 to create an artificial ionosphere above the Earth. This was done to solve a major weakness that had been identified in military communications.

History

At the height of the Cold War, all international communications were either sent through submarine communications cables or bounced off the natural ionosphere. The United States military were concerned that the Soviets might cut those cables, forcing the unpredictable ionosphere to be the only means of communication with overseas forces.

To mitigate the potential threat, Walter E. Morrow started Project Needles at the MIT Lincoln Laboratory in 1958. The goal of the project was to place a ring of 480,000,000 copper dipole antennas in orbit to facilitate global radio communication. The dipoles collectively provided passive support to Project Westford's parabolic dish (located at the Haystack Observatory in the town of Westford) to communicate with distant sites.

The length was chosen because it was half the wavelength of the 8 GHz signal used in the study.

A first attempt was launched on 21 October 1961, during which the needles failed to disperse. The project was eventually successful with the 9 May 1963 launch, with radio transmissions carried by the man-made ring. However, the technology was ultimately shelved, partially due to the development of the modern communications satellite and partially due to protests from other scientists.

British radio astronomers, together with optical astronomers and the Royal Astronomical Society, protested the experiment. The Soviet newspaper Pravda also joined the protests under the headline "U.S.A. Dirties Space". The International Academy of Astronautics regards the experiment as the worst deliberate release of space debris.

At the time, the issue was raised in the United Nations where then United States Ambassador to the United Nations Adlai Stevenson defended the project. Stevenson studied the published journal articles on Project West Ford.  Using what he learned on the subject and citing the articles he had read, he successfully allayed the fears exhibited by the vast majority of UN ambassadors from other countries. He and the articles explained that sunlight pressure would cause the dipoles to only remain in orbit for a short period of approximately three years. The international protest ultimately resulted in a consultation provision included in the 1967 Outer Space Treaty.

Although the dispersed needles in the second experiment removed themselves from orbit within a few years, some of the dipoles that had not deployed correctly still remained in clumps, contributing a small amount of the orbital debris tracked by NASA's Orbital Debris Program Office.  Their numbers have been diminishing over time as they occasionally re-enter.  , 45 clumps of needles larger than 10 cm were still known to be in orbit.

Launches

References

Space hazards
Satellites of the United States
1961 in the United States
1961 in science
1962 in the United States
1962 in science
1963 in the United States
1963 in science
Military projects of the United States
1961 in spaceflight
1962 in spaceflight
1963 in spaceflight